The women's discus throw event at the 2015 Asian Athletics Championships was held on June 4.

Results

References

Discus
Discus throw at the Asian Athletics Championships
2015 in women's athletics